The MV Yakima is a  operated by Washington State Ferries. The Yakima was built in 1967 for the Seattle–Bremerton run and remained there until the early 1980s when she was moved to the Edmonds–Kingston run where she was a better match for ridership levels.

In 1999 she was extensively rebuilt, and then she was moved to the Anacortes–San Juan Islands route. She was removed from service in the spring of 2014 to have her drive motors rebuilt, and returned to service in Fall 2014.

In March 2016 there was a fire on the vessel while running in the San Juan Islands. The vessel clogged passage to and from Friday harbor for several hours and the ship was out of service for some time. The Yakima has since returned to service in the San Juans.

References

External links 

Vessel info from WSDOT

Washington State Ferries vessels
1967 ships